Bandari FC is a Tanzanian football club based in Mtwara. They play in the top flight of Tanzanian football. Their home games are played at Umoja Stadium.

History 
The club reached the finals of the SportPesa Cup in 2019, after beating the favorites Simba SC 2–1. In the cup final, they faced Kariobangi Sharks and lost 1–0.

Honours 
SportPesa Cup:

 Runners-up: 2019

References

Football clubs in Tanzania
Mtwara Region